Uromastyx thomasi, the Omani spiny-tailed lizard or Thomas's mastigure, is a species of agamid lizard. It is found in Oman and Kuwait.

References

Uromastyx
Reptiles of the Middle East
Reptiles described in 1930
Taxa named by Hampton Wildman Parker